Winston Hills is a suburb of Sydney, in the state of New South Wales, Australia. Winston Hills is located 28 kilometres west of the Sydney central business district in the local government areas of the City of Parramatta and The Hills Shire. Winston Hills is part of the Hills District region of Greater Western Sydney.

History
Winston Hills was named after Britain's Prime Minister Winston Churchill (1874–1965) during World War II. With the name being preferred to Churchill Hills. In the early days, this area was named Model Farms (a name retained in a locality of the suburb and local high school) as this was the area where a model farm was developed to show settlers the types of crops that could be grown in different seasons.

Development of the suburb began in the 1960s by Hooker Rex, and there is little undeveloped land left. In 2009 the last remaining large parcel of vacant land, at Buckleys Hill, started to be developed. There is not much natural bushland left in the suburb, except for the creek corridors, like Toongabbie Creek. It was transferred from the local government area of the City of Blacktown to the City of Parramatta in 1972.

 Some streets are named after great writers such as Bronte Place, Shelley Street, Twain Street, Voltaire Road and Homer Street which also links to other street names from Greek mythology such as Troy Place, Hera Place, Nestor Street, Ixion Street, Eros Place, Remus Place, Romulus Street, Latona Street, Olympus Street and Atlas Place. Other group of streets are named after great scientists Einstein, Volta, Lister, Edison and Marconi or Biblical figures such as Goliath, Gideon and Esther.

A residence on Oakes Road, number 40, was sold in December 2011. This property had been owned by the late Frank Whiting. The building on the site was once the accommodation for the staff who worked on the dairy situated on Oakes Road up to what is now Rebecca Parade. This dairy was operated by the Sisters of the Good Shepherd. It operated during the Second World War years. Previously, a stone homestead named "Casuarina" built for George Oakes in 1861 was located on the site, and likely demolished during the development of Winston Hills. Frank purchased the property when the dairy closed in the late 1940s and he clearly remembered the One Tree Hill Golf course that ran from behind the dairy along what is now Rebecca Parade and Goliath Avenue up to Old Windsor Road. Soon after the 2011 sale of number 40, the building was demolished to make way for the duplex that currently stands on the site.

Heritage listings 
Winston Hills has a number of heritage-listed sites, including:
 Goliath Avenue: Toongabbie Government Farm Archaeological Site
 76 Lanhams Road: Late Victorian house built in the 1880s
 41 Buckleys Road: Buckley House, built circa 1891

Population
In the 2021 Census, there were 12,123 people in Winston Hills. 68.7% of people were born in Australia. The most common countries of birth were China 3.6%, India 3.6%, England 2.7%, Lebanon 1.4%, and South Korea 1.3%.  69.8% of people only spoke English at home. Other languages spoken at home included Mandarin 4.0%, Arabic 3.9%, Cantonese 2.6%, Korean 1.8%, and Hindi 1.6%. The most common responses for religion were Catholic 33.9%, No Religion 25.5% and Anglican 12.7%.

Commercial area

Winston Hills Mall is a shopping centre that features a Big W discount department store, Woolworths supermarket, Coles supermarket, Aldi supermarket, over 75 specialty shops and a food court. "The Winston" is a pub and restaurant located next to the shopping mall. Further east along Caroline Chisholm Drive is a small shopping centre known as the Chisholm Centre. On the southern side of the hill is a small shopping centre called the Lomond Centre and approximately 500 metres west of it is another row of shops, named Rebecca Parade shops. There is also a Chambers Cellars liquor store on Lanhams Road.

Schools
Primary Schools
Winston Hills Public School

Built-in 1970, Winston Hills Public School was originally considered to be called "Model Farms Public School" due
to the original name of the area which had been changed only a few years earlier to "Winston Hills".

Winston Heights Public School
St Paul the Apostle

Senior Schools
Model Farms High School (located in Baulkham Hills, but is very close to the Winston Hills boundary)
Construction commenced in 1974 and the school opened in 1975. It focuses on agriculture, similar to the Model Farms the area once was.

Sport and recreation
Winston Hills has Girl Guides, Scouts, rugby league, baseball, football and netballclubs.  The football club (The Bears) is one of the largest in suburban Sydney.

In 1983, Winston Hills Warriors Baseball Club was established after breaking away from Baulkham Hills. WHBC started playing at Col Sutton Park, just down the road from Model Farms High School. Winston Hills is one of the best clubs in senior A grade baseball in Sydney.

In 2010, the Winston Hills Girl Guides joined worldwide celebrations for the centenary (100th birthday) of the Guiding movement during the nationally acclaimed 'Year of the Girl Guide'.  The Winston Hills Scouts also mark the 40th anniversary for their district.

References

External links
 Winston Hills Girl Guides
 Winston Hills Scouts

 
Suburbs of Sydney
The Hills Shire
City of Parramatta